Kevin Donald McKinlay (born 28 February 1986, in Stirling) is a Scottish professional footballer who plays as a left wingback.

Career
McKinlay signed for Scottish club Ross County after being released by Chelsea, where he was a product of the club's youth system. After a few seasons at the Staggies, McKinlay moved to Glasgow side Partick Thistle in August 2007. Upon the ending of his time at Thistle, he went across the Irish Sea to sign for Dundalk in July 2009.

At the end of the Irish season, he returned home to Scotland to sign for Scottish Football League First Division team Greenock Morton during the January transfer window of 2010. He was released in May 2011. After his release from Morton, McKinlay dropped a division to sign for Second Division side Stenhousemuir. In May 2012, McKinlay signed on for a further season at Stenhousemuir. In June 2014, McKinlay announced on his Twitter that he would be joining Ayr United, following his release from Stenhousemuir. He was released by Ayr in January 2015, and quickly signed an 18-month deal at Stirling Albion, where he stayed until the end of the 2015–16 season.

On 2 June 2016 McKinlay became Berwick Rangers' second signing of the summer transfer window after Jordyn Sheerin joined the club the previous day. McKinlay spent two seasons with Berwick, before leaving in May 2018.

McKinlay played for Linlithgow Rose between 2018-2020.

Career statistics

Honours
Ross County
Scottish Challenge Cup: 2006–07

References

External links

1986 births
Stenhousemuir F.C. players
Living people
Footballers from Stirling
Scottish footballers
Chelsea F.C. players
Ross County F.C. players
Partick Thistle F.C. players
Dundalk F.C. players
Linlithgow Rose F.C. players
League of Ireland players
Scottish Football League players
Greenock Morton F.C. players
Stirling Albion F.C. players
Berwick Rangers F.C. players
Association football fullbacks